Germán Londoño is a Colombian artist from Medellín.  He is mostly known as a painter but recently has begun sculpting. He has exhibited in museums in Lisbon and Bogotá, as well as galleries in Colombia, Italy and New York City.

References

External links
 http://germanlondono.co/
 exhibition history, Bogota Museum of Art

Colombian painters
Colombian sculptors
Modern painters
Modern sculptors
Living people
20th-century Colombian sculptors
Year of birth missing (living people)
20th-century Colombian painters
20th-century Colombian male artists
21st-century sculptors
21st-century painters
Colombian male painters